Antoinette Kensel Thurgood (?–?) was an American philanthropist, Christian women's community organizer, and newspaper editor. She was the founder of the Women's Conference of the Churches of Christ in Victoria, Australia.

Biography
Born in Lexington, Kentucky, Thurgood was the daughter of Christian Kensel and Mary Ann (Butt) Kensel. She was educated at Sayre Institute (now Sayre School) in Lexington.

Thurgood was the organizer of the first Christian Endeavor Society in Australasia at Geelong, Victoria, February 1883. She was the founder of the Women's Conference of the Churches of Christ, also in Victoria.

Thurgood served as a member of the Board of the Union Missionary Societies of Allegheny County, as representative of the Christian Church, 1907-1908; a member of the Board of Managers of the Bethesda Home, Pittsburgh, Pennsylvania; life member of the Christian Women's Board of Missions, Indianapolis, Indiana; life member of the American Christian Missionary Society, Cincinnati, Ohio; honorary president of the Women's Conference of the Associated Churches of Christ, Victoria. Australia; organizer of the Christion Women's Florida Missionary Society at Ocoee, Florida; and Pennsylvania State secretary of the Christian Women's Board of Missions for nine years.

She also served as associate editor of the White Ribbon Signal, Woman's Christian Temperance Union, Melbourne, Victoria, Australia; and editor of the women's page of the Australian Christian in Melbourne.

She married Charles Lloyd Thurgood at Lexington on June 13, 1882; they travelled in 1882 from Kentucky to Australia, via Europe, Egypt, and Ceylon, before returning to Kentucky.

References

Attribution
 

Year of birth unknown
Year of death unknown
Writers from Lexington, Kentucky
American philanthropists
American women editors
American editors
Kentucky women writers
Kentucky women philanthropists
Women's page journalists
Organization founders
Women founders